Glimmerglass State Park is a  state park located north of Cooperstown, in Otsego County, New York. Most of the park is located inside the Town of Springfield.

Park description
Glimmerglass State Park is located at Hyde Bay on the east shore of Otsego Lake, which is the "Glimmerglass" lake of James Fenimore Cooper's Leatherstocking Tales. The Hyde Hall mansion overlooks the bay and most of the grounds.

The park offers a beach, picnic tables with pavilions, a playground, recreation programs, a nature trail, hiking and biking, fishing and ice fishing, a campground with tent and trailer sites, ice skating, cross-country skiing and snowmobiling and a food concession. The park is open year-round.

Triathlon 
Until 2019 the park had hosted the Cooperstown/Glimmerglas triathlon for many years.

See also
 List of New York state parks

References

External links
 New York State Parks: Glimmerglass State Park
 Friends of Glimmerglass State Park

State parks of New York (state)
Campgrounds in New York (state)
Parks in Otsego County, New York